Saint-Georges-en-Auge (literally Saint-Georges in Auge) is a former commune in the Calvados department in the Normandy region in northwestern France. On 1 January 2017, it was merged into the new commune Saint-Pierre-en-Auge.

Population

See also
Communes of the Calvados department

References

Further reading

 Jack Maneuvrier, catalogue de l'exposition Saint-Georges-en-Auge, Deux mille ans d'histoire et de traditions populaires, Foyer rural du Billot, Le Billot-Montpinçon, 1984, 84 p.
 Dominique Fournier, Étude microtoponymique de Saint-Georges-en-Auge, commune du Pays d'Auge, mémoire de DEA, Université Paris XIII, Villetaneuse, 1986, 96 + V p.
 Dominique Fournier, « Anciens lieux-dits à Saint-Georges-en-Auge » I, in Histoire et Traditions Populaires n° 37 (mars 1991), Foyer Rural du Billot-Montpinçon, Montpinçon, p. 63-69.
 Dominique Fournier, « Anciens lieux-dits à Saint-Georges-en-Auge » II, in Histoire et Traditions Populaires n° 39 (septembre 1992), Foyer Rural du Billot-Montpinçon, Montpinçon, p. 29-36.
 Martine et Dominique Fournier, Saint-Georges-en-Auge, Éditions des Mortes-Terres, Saint-Georges-en-Auge, 2007, 32 p.

Former communes of Calvados (department)
Calvados communes articles needing translation from French Wikipedia